The Nokia 2760 is a clamshell Mobile phone released by Nokia in 2007 and manufactured in Hungary. Its operating frequency is Dual band GSM 900/1800 or 850/1900. The phone supports EDGE for mobile broadband. The Nokia 2760 was popular in the late-2000s, with it being the most popular choice of mobile phone in Finland in 2010.

Nokia 2760 Flip
In December 2021, HMD Global announced a re-release of the Nokia 2760. Branded the Nokia 2760 Flip, the phone is to feature KaiOS, a five-megapixel camera, MicroSD storage and support for Wi-Fi and Bluetooth connectivity, as well as GPS navigation and 4G connectivity.

Nokia 2780 Flip
Nokia 2780 Flip is essentially 2760 Flip with FM radio, and connect via USB Type-C, but 0.1 inch smaller display. It is also not carrier-locked. The Nokia 2780 Flip announced in November 2022.

References

2760
Mobile phones introduced in 2007